Aleksandr Georgievich Filippenko (born September 2, 1944) is a Soviet and Russian actor. People's Artist of Russia (2000).

Biography
He was born in Moscow. His parents moved to Alma-Ata, Kazakhstan where he graduated from high school. Later on he entered MIPT where he took active part in MFTI KVN team. The first time he appeared on stage at the MSU Variety Studio Our Home in a stage adaptation of Kersanov's Story of Tsar Emelian. Since 1969 Filippenko was a key member of Taganka Theater. In 1970 he entered Boris Shchukin Theatre Institute and graduated with honors. In 1975 he started working at Vakhtangov Theater where he took part in famous plays "Treaty of Brest-Litovsk" (Брестский Мир) "Richard III" and many others. There he met, worked with and became good friends with director Robert Sturua. Filippenko left Vakhtangov Theater in 1994 and started his own theatrical project "Mono-Duet-Trio". Since 1995 Filippenko is a freelance actor, working in various theatres: in Satirikon theatre playing Claudius and the Ghost in "Hamlet", in Et Cetera theatre playing Antonio in "The Merchant of Venice", in Tabakerka theatre playing Satin in "The Lower Depths", in Mossoveta theatre playing Serebryakov in Chekhov's "Uncle Vanya" and Batenin/Akimov in "Anteroom" (Предбанник) by Sergei Yursky. He directs and plays various mono-plays (one man shows) such as "One Day in the Life of Ivan Denisovich" and "Product" in Praktika theatre, "Enthusiast's demarche" in Polytheatre and many others based on Russian classical literature.

In May 2022 Filippenko posted a photo of himself on Facebook wearing a vyshyvanka (a Ukrainian embroidered shirt) in protest against the 2022 Russian invasion of Ukraine. Following this Russian theatres started to refuse appearances by Filippenko.

In February 2023 Filippenko's daughter Alexandra told TV Rain that her father had left Russia and was living in Vilnius, Lithuania because of "his position on Russia’s invasion of Ukraine."

Filmography
Champion of the World (Чемпион мира, 2021) as Leonid Brezhnev
Peter the Great: The Testament (Пётр Первый. Завещание, 2011) as Pyotr Andreyevich Tolstoy
Happy Penis (Счастливый конец, 2010) as Old Penis
My Fair Nanny (Моя прекрасная няня, 2008) as Vladimir Prutkovskiy
One Night of Love (Одна ночь любви, 2008) as Prince Illarion Zabelin
Attack on Leningrad (Ленинград, 2007) as Arkatov
Conspiracy (Заговор, 2007) as Dmitry Kosorotov, prozektor
Asiris Nuna (Азирис Нуна, 2006) as Pharaoh Nemenkhotep IV
Adjutants of Love (Адьютанты любви, 2005) as Boris Kuragin
Brezhnev (Брежнев, 2005) as General Cinyov
Master and Margarita (Мастер и Маргарита, 2005) as Azazello
Poor Nastya (Бедная Настя, 2003) as Andrey Platonovich Zabaluev
Investigation Held by ZnaToKi (Следствие ведут ЗнаТоКи, 2002) as Landyshev
Lady for a Day (Леди на день, 2002) as Count Alfonso Romero
The Romanovs: An Imperial Family (Романовы. Венценосная семья, 2000) as Vladimir Lenin
The Career of Arturo Ui (Карьера Артура Уи, 1996) as Arturo Ui
Master and Margarita (Мастер и Маргарита, 1994) as Korovyev
Visit to Minotaur (Визит к Минотавру, 1987) as Gregory Belash
Confrontation (Противостояние, 1985) as Roman Zhuravlev
Copper Angel (Медный ангел, 1984) as Santillano
My Friend Ivan Lapshin (Мой друг Иван Лапшин, 1984) as Zanadvorov
Applause, Applause... (Аплодисменты, аплодисменты..., 1984)
The Star and Death of Joaquin Murieta (Звезда и смерть Хоакина Мурьеты, 1982) as Death
Along Unknown Paths (Там, на неведомых дорожках..., 1982) as Koschei
Who will pay for Luck? (Кто заплатит за удачу?, 1980)
Bumbarash (Бумбараш, 1971) as White Guard Strigunov
Shine, Shine, My Star (Гори, гори, моя звезда, 1970) as white officer
I'm His Bride (1969) as Vladimir Kharlamov

References

External links

  Aleksandr Filippenko at Peoples 

1944 births
Living people
20th-century Russian male actors
21st-century Russian male actors
Male actors from Moscow
Moscow Institute of Physics and Technology alumni
Honored Artists of the RSFSR
People's Artists of Russia
State Prize of the Russian Federation laureates
Audiobook narrators
Russian male film actors
Russian male stage actors
Russian male television actors
Russian male voice actors
Soviet male film actors
Soviet male stage actors
Soviet male television actors
Soviet male voice actors
Russian activists against the 2022 Russian invasion of Ukraine
Russian exiles